Viet Nam National University Ho Chi Minh City (VNUHCM) is one of the two largest national research universities in Vietnam (the other is Vietnam National University, Hanoi), founded on 27 January 1995, and reorganized on 12 February 2001, under the Decision no. 15/2001/QĐ-TTg by the Prime Minister of Vietnam Phan Văn Khải. The university now provides undergraduate and graduate education to 56,427 students, including:

99 undergraduate programs
105 M.Sc and M.Eng programs
79 doctoral programs

The education professionals cover technology, natural sciences, basic sciences, social sciences and humanities, literature, foreign languages, and business. The headquarters of the university is in Linh Trung ward, Thủ Đức, Ho Chi Minh City. The university is planning a campus project the area of 643.7 ha.

History 
Viet Nam National University Ho Chi Minh City was founded on 27 January 1995 by Government Decree 16/CP on the basis of the merger of nine universities (members): (University of Ho Chi Minh City, Thu Duc Technology Training University, Ho Chi Minh City University of Technology, Ho Chi Minh City University of Agriculture and Sylviculture, University of Economics, University of Accounting and Finance, Ho Chi Minh City University of Education (or Ho Chi Minh City Pedagogical University), Ho Chi Minh City Architecture University, branch of Law University of Hanoi into eight members and officially declared on 6 February 1996.

On 12 February 2001, Vietnamese Prime Minister Phan Văn Khải signed a Decision no. 15/2001/QĐ-TTg on the reorganization of this university. According to the decision, Viet Nam National University Ho Chi Minh City, the same applied for Vietnam National University, Hanoi, shall have specific internal organization and activity (unlike the one applicable for other Vietnamese universities), will be given priority to involve in education of postgraduate and science research of spheres of technologies, to be a pioneer in education and science, to contribute significantly to the country's economic and scientific development.

Also in this decision, some member colleges were split from Ho Chi Minh City National University and came under the management of the Ministry of Education. At present, Viet Nam National University Ho Chi Minh City consists of six member colleges (referred to as "universities"), two schools, and one institute:
VNUHCM University of Technology
VNUHCM University of Science
VNUHCM University of Social Sciences and Humanities
VNUHCM International University
VNUHCM University of Information Technology
VNUHCM University of Economics and Law
VNUHCM An Giang University
VNUHCM School of Medicine
VNUHCM School of Politicial and Administration Sciences
VNUHCM Institute for Environment and Resources
…

Member universities and institute 

Viet Nam National University Ho Chi Minh City includes the following members:

VNUHCM University of Technology
This university offers:
Education of engineers: IT, Chemical Engineering, Mechanical Engineering, Electricity – Electronics, Construction and Civil, Applied Sciences, Industrial Management, Environment Management, Geology–Petroleum Engineering, Transportation Engineering, Materials Technology
Master's degree: Drilling and Petrochemical Engineering, Biology, MBA, Technical Physics, Mineral Geology and Exploration, Environmental Geology, Geological Technics, Mapping, Remote Sensing, Applied Maths, Computer Sciences, Technical Mechanics, Engine Manufacture Engineering, Rough Draft Production, Industry System, Automobile Technics & Tack, Electrical grid and generator, Automation, Electronics, Chemical Engineering, Thermal Engineering, Chemical Process and Equipment, Geodesy, Food and Beverage Technology, Civil and Construction, Bridge Construction Engineering, Road Construction Engineering, Waterway Construction Engineering, Offshore Structural Construction, Geotechnology, Construction Materials and construction materials Engineering, Construction Management, Inorganic Chemical Engineering, Metal Engineering, Polymer Engineering, Environmental Technology, Environmental Management, Construction Equipment.
Doctoral Degree: Business Administration, Technical Physics, Quaternary geology, geo-tectonic, Mapping, Food and Beverage Processing, Engine Manufacturing Engineering, Textile Engineering, Petrochemical Engineering, Organic Chemical Engineering, Inorganic Chemical Engineering, Material Shaping Engineering, Airconditioning Engineering, Thermal Equipment Engineering, New Energy, Geodesy, Food and Beverage Technology, Civil and Construction, Bride Construction Engineering, Road Construction Engineering, Waterway Construction Engineering, Offshore Structural Construction, Geotechnology, Construction Materials and construction materials Engineering, Construction Management, Inorganic Chemical Engineering, Metal Engineering, Polymer Engineering, Environmental Technology, Environmental Management, Construction Equipment.

VNUHCM University of Science
University-level education of Mathematics and Computer Science, Information Technology, Physics and Engineering Physics, Chemistry, Geology, Biology, Biotech, Environmental Sciences, Material Sciences, Electronic and Telecommunication Science.
College level of IT, Electronics, Math – Applied IT.
Master's Degree: Experimental biology, Microbiology, Ecology, Genetics, Theoretical Physics and Mathematical Physics, Radio-physics and Electronics, Atomic Physics, Nuclear and High-energy, Optics, Physics of the globe, Inorganic Chemistry, Organic Chemistry, Analytical chemistry, Physical Chemistry and Theoretical Chemistry, Geology, Petrology, Mineralogy and Geochemistry, Hydrogeology, Construction Geology, Oceanography, Hydrometeorology, Differential and Integral Calculus, Algebra and Number Theory, Topology and Geometry, Probability Theory and Mathematical Statistics, Optimization theory, Mathematical Assurance of Computer Systems, Computer Science, Environmental Science, Environmental Management, Applied Mechanics, Theoretical Mechanics.
Doctoral Degree: Human and Animal Physiology, Plant Physiology, Biochemistry, Microbiology, Ecology, Genetics, Theoretical Physics and Mathematical Physics, Radio-Physics and Electronics, Atomic Physics and Nuclear, High-energy Physics, Solid State Physics, Optical, Mechanical, Body Solid, Organic Chemistry, Analytical Chemistry, Petrology, Mineralogy, Geochemistry, marine fossils of marine dynamics, marine chemistry, Differential and Integral Calculus, Differential and Integral Equations, Algebra and Number Theory, Topology and Geometry, Probability Theory and Mathematical Statistics, Theory and Optimization, Computer Science, Environmental Land and Water, Micro Electronics and circuit design.

VNUHCM University of Social Sciences and Humanities
University level education of Psychology, Philosophy, Literature and Press, International Relations, Orient Research, History, Social Work, Tourism, Urban Studies, English Literature, Korean Studies, Russian Literature, Japanese Studies, French Literature, Italian Literature, Chinese Literature, German Literature, Geography, Social Studies, Education Studies, Cultural Studies, Library - Information, Sociology, Vietnamese Studies and Vietnamese language for foreigners.
Master's level education of Asian studies, Social science, Ethnography, Urban Studies, Geography Studies, Sino-Vietnamese characters, Archaeology, Library Information Science, History of the Communist Party of Vietnam, History of world, History of Vietnam, Literary theory, Theory and Method of teaching English, Linguistics, Russian Literature, French Literature, Anthropology, International Relations, Management Education, Resource and Environmental Management, Philosophy, Cultural Studies, Foreign Literature, Literature of Vietnam, Vietnam Studies, Sociology, etc.
Doctoral Degree: Dialectical materialism and Historical materialism, Ethnology, Archaeology, History of World, History of Vietnam, Literary Theory, Linguistics, Comparative Linguistics, Russian Literature, Resource and Environmental Management, Cultural Studies, Literature of Vietnam, Cultural Studies

VNUHCM International University
Ho Chi Minh City International University is a research-oriented university founded in 2003 and it became the first public university in Vietnam whose language of teaching is mainly English. It is now in cooperation with University of Nottingham, University of the West of England, Auckland University of Technology, Binghamton University, Rutgers, The State University of New Jersey, University of New South Wales, Asian Institute of Technology and The Catholic University of America. Diploma may be issued by National University or by its partners. 
 The university offers undergraduate programmes : Aquatic Resource Management, Automation & Control Engineering, Banking & Finance, Biochemistry, Biomedical Engineering, Biotechnology, Business Administration, Civil Engineering, Electrical Engineering, Financial Engineering & Risk Management, Food Technology, Industrial System Engineering, Information Technology, Logistics & Supply Chain Management, Space Engineering, English Linguistics.
 The university offers graduate programmes in: Biomedical Engineering, Biotechnology, Business Administration, Electrical Engineering, Aquatic Resource Management, Information Technology Management, Industrial & Systems Engineering, Public Management, Science in Leadership (Degree from College of Professional studies, Northeastern University).
 The university offer Ph.D. programmes : Biotechnology and Business Administration.

VNUHCM University of Information Technology
University level education in Computer Science, Computer Engineering, Software Engineering, Information System and Network and Communication.
Master's Degree: Computer Science
Doctoral Degree: Computer Science

VNUHCM University of Economics and Law
The university was founded in 2000 as the Faculty of Economics under Viet Nam National University, Ho Chi Minh City. In 2010, the faculty was promoted to member university status.

University level education of Economics, External Economics, Community Economics, Finance and Banking, Accounting/Auditing, Info Network, Business Administration, Business Law and International Trade Law.
Master's Degree: Economics, Economics and Public Management, Political Economy, International Economics, Banking and Finance, Accounting, Business Management, Economic Law, Civil Law and Civil Procedure.
Doctoral Degree: Economics, political economy, finance-banking, Economic Law

VNUHCM An Giang University

VNUHCM School of Medicine

VNUHCM School of Politicial and Administration Sciences

VNUHCM Institute of Environment and Resources

…

Affiliated units

High School for the Gifted
John von Neumann Institute
Institute of University Governance
International Education Institute
IC Design Research and Education Center
Integrated Circuit Research and Education Center
Institute for Nanotechnology
Center for Political Science
Center for Predoctoral Training
Campus in Ben Tre Province
Center for National Defense Studies and Student Securiry
Central Library
Publishing House
Information Technology Park
Center for Educational Testing and Quality Assessment
Center of Water Management and Climate Change
Center for Intellectual Property and Technology Transfer
Journal of Science and Technology Development
Center for Dormitory Management
Center for Investment Promotion and Services
Center for Campus Management and Development
Construction Project Management Unit
Development Foundation
English Testing Center 
Center for Innovative Materials and Architectures (INOMAR)

Board of Presidents

President 
Associate Prof. Dr. Vũ Hải Quân

Vice president 
Associate Prof. Dr. Nguyễn Minh Tâm

See also
List of universities in Vietnam

Notes

External links 
Official website

Universities in Ho Chi Minh City
ASEAN University Network